Steven N. Olson (born January 30, 1947) is the Iowa State Representative from the 83rd District. A Republican, he has served in the Iowa House of Representatives since 2003.

, Olson serves on several committees in the Iowa House - the Agriculture and Public Safety committees and the Environmental Protection committee, where he is the chair.  His political experience includes serving as assistant majority leader in the Iowa House.

Electoral history
*incumbent

References

External links

 Representative Steven Olson official Iowa General Assembly site
 
Profile at Iowa House Republicans

Republican Party members of the Iowa House of Representatives
Living people
1947 births
Politicians from Clinton, Iowa